Clairvius Narcisse (January 2, 1922 – 1994) was a Haitian man who claimed to have been turned into a zombie by a Haitian vodou, and forced to work as a slave.

The hypothesis for Narcisse's account was that he had been administered a combination of psychoactive substances (often the paralyzing pufferfish venom tetrodotoxin and the strong deliriant Datura), which rendered him helpless and seemingly dead.

The greatest proponent of this possibility was Wade Davis, a graduate student in ethnobotany at Harvard University, who published two popular books based on his travels and ideas during and immediately following his graduate training.

However, subsequent examinations (using tools of analytical chemistry alongside critical review of earlier reports) have failed to support the presence of the key active compounds in the supposed zombie preparation, which was central to the phenomenon and mechanism reported by Davis.

Biography
Narcisse admitted himself to the Schweitzer Hospital (operated by American medical staff) in Deschapelles, Haiti, on April 30, 1962. He had a fever and fatigue, and was spitting up blood. Doctors could find no explanation for his symptoms, which gradually grew worse until he appeared to die three days later. He was pronounced dead, and held in cold storage for about a day before burial.

In 1980, a man identifying himself as Clairvius Narcisse approached Angelina Narcisse in the city of L'Estère, convincing her and several other villagers of his identity by using a childhood nickname and sharing intimate family information. He claimed that he had been conscious but paralyzed during his supposed death and burial, and had subsequently been removed from his grave and forced to work at a sugar plantation.

Per his account, after his apparent death and subsequent burial on May 2, 1962, his coffin was exhumed and he was given a paste possibly made from datura, which at certain doses has a hallucinogenic effect and can cause memory loss. The bokor who recovered him then, as stated, reportedly forced him, alongside others, to work on a sugar plantation until the master's death two years later. When the bokor died, and regular doses of the hallucinogen ceased, he eventually regained sanity and returned to his family after another 16 years. Narcisse was immediately recognized by the villagers and his family. When he told them the story of how he was dug up from his grave and enslaved, the villagers were surprised, but they accepted his story because they believed his experience resulted from the power of voodoo magic. He was seen as the man who was once a zombie.

It has been further argued that Narcisse had broken one of the traditional behavioral codes by abandoning his children and was made into a "zombie" as a punishment. When questioned, Narcisse told investigators that the sorcerer involved had "taken his soul". The instigator of the poisoning was alleged to be Clairvius's brother, with whom Clairvius had quarreled over land and inheritance. He only returned home once he heard of his brother's death.

This case puzzled many doctors because Narcisse's death was documented and verified by the testimonies of two American doctors. The case of Narcisse was argued to be the first verifiable example of the transformation of an individual into a zombie. Narcisse's story intrigued Haitian psychiatrist Lamarque Douyon. Though dismissing supernatural explanations, Douyon believed there was some degree of truth to tales of zombies and he had been studying such accounts for decades. Suspecting zombies were somehow drugged and then revived, Douyon reached out to colleagues in America. Davis traveled to Haiti, where he obtained samples of powders purportedly used to create zombies.

Hypothesis and research
Based on the presumption that tetrodotoxin and related toxins are not always fatal, but at near-lethal doses can leave a person in a state of near-death for several days with the person remaining conscious, tetrodotoxin has been alleged to turn human beings into zombies, and has been suggested as an ingredient in Haitian Vodou preparations.

This idea appeared in print as early as the 1938 non-fiction book Tell My Horse by Zora Neale Hurston, which reported multiple accounts of purported tetrodotoxin poisoning in Haiti, by a Bokor (voodoo sorcerer).

The concept was subsequently popularized in the 1980s by ethnobotanist Wade Davis.

However, subsequent research has discredited the tetrodotoxin-zombie hypothesis by using analytical chemistry-based tests of multiple preparations, and review of earlier reports (see below).

After various anthropological investigations of "zombie" stories in various cultures—including Narcisse and a handful of others—reports appeared that Narcisse received a dose of a chemical mixture containing tetrodotoxin (a pufferfish toxin) and bufotoxin (a toad toxin) to induce a coma that mimicked the appearance of death. He was then allowed to return to his home where he collapsed, "died", and was buried.

The Canadian ethnobotanist Wade Davis, who did research related to the implication that tetrodotoxin was present, hypothesized how this might have been done. The bokor (sorcerer) would have given Narcisse a powder containing the tetrodotoxin through abraded skin. Narcisse would then have fallen into a comatose state, closely resembling death, which resulted in his live burial. His body would then have been recovered and he would have been given doses of Datura stramonium to create a compliant zombie-like state, and set to work on a plantation. After two years, the plantation owner died and Narcisse would have simply walked away to freedom.

Skepticism
While in these popular accounts, and in Haiti, tetrodotoxin is thought to have been used in voodoo preparations, in so-called zombie poisons, subsequent careful analysis has repeatedly called these accounts and early analytical studies into question on technical grounds; moreover, they have failed to identify the toxin in any such preparation, such that discussion of the matter of tetrodotoxin use in this way has all but disappeared from the primary literature since the early 1990s. Kao and Yasumoto  concluded in the first of their papers in 1986 (and remained unswerving on the matter in their later work) that "the widely circulated claim in the lay press to the effect that tetrodotoxin is ... causal agent" in a "zombification process" is, in their view, "without factual foundation."

Kao, of the State University of New York, on interview on the matter in 1988, stated, "I actually feel this is an issue of fraud in science". A supporter of Wade, Bo Holmstedt of the Karolinska Institute, more restrained, stated that it was "not deliberated fraud," rather that it was "withholding negative data" and therefore "simply bad science."

Davis responded formally to the charges, arguing the variability of the preparations (as cause for Kao's inability to find the toxin in any) and possible ineptitude in dissolving the toxin by the otherwise admittedly expert Kao, and speculating on the presence of "other ingredients" in the preparations to "enable transport across the blood–brain barrier" thus providing the needed "reduction of three orders of magnitude" of the amount needed to result in the claimed effects, and arguing that "only when the bokor … causes others to believe the victim is dead and then revived" do his efforts become apparent, and that only a single "success … would be sufficient to support the cultural belief in the … phenomenon." As of 1990, his critics were unpersuaded, and no literature to support the original contentions has yet appeared as of 2015, although lively popular description, especially on the web, continues.

Cinema

Narcisse's story was loosely adapted into The Serpent and the Rainbow, a 1988 American horror film directed by Wes Craven.

Zombi Child, a 2019 French drama film, is also inspired by his story.

References 

1922 births
1994 deaths
Haitian Vodou
People from Artibonite (department)
Zombies
Caribbean legendary creatures